The Reserve Fleet was a Royal Navy formation of decommissioned vessels which could be brought to a state of readiness at time of war.

In the early years of the 18th century ships were "laid up in ordinary" at various British naval bases forming a repository for serviceable but decommissioned ships. Sir John Fisher's reforms made these reserve ships more ready for combat, in the lead up to the First World War. 

Whilst warships had been laid up in ordinary routinely, the establishment of a Reserve Fleet as a separate, formally established naval formation dated to the change in title and appointment of Vice Admiral Henry Oliver in November 1919. With the breakup of the Grand Fleet in April 1919, Royal Navy forces in home waters was divided between a new Atlantic Fleet consisting of the most powerful naval units, and a Home Fleet consisting of ships with nucleus crews and other vessels. On 8 April Admiral Sir Charles E. Madden became Commander-in-Chief, Home and Atlantic Fleets, and Vice-Admiral Sir Henry F. Oliver was appointed in command of the Home Fleet. The Home Fleet then consisted of the 3rd Battle Squadron of six ships, and the Fourth and Fifth Destroyer Flotillas totaling 35 destroyers and destroyer leaders.  This arrangement lasted until 1 October 1919, when the Fleet was reduced to a reserve basis, and "Home Fleet" was dropped from the Commander-in-Chief's title. On 1 November Vice-Admiral Oliver's title was changed to Vice-Admiral Commanding, Reserve Fleet.

It continued to exist in the inter-war years but in 1930 the Admiralty reduced it in size on the basis that war was unlikely in the next ten years, under the Government's Ten Year Rule. At the start of the Second World War the Reserve Fleet, under the command of Vice Admiral Sir Max Horton, was again brought to a state of readiness. Some 15,000 men were called up in May 1939 to man the Reserve Fleet which became ready for service on 15 June 1939. During the 1950s ships were regularly 'cocooned' for the Reserve Fleet and it ceased to exist in 1960.

Commanding admirals
Admirals commanding included:
 1919–1920 Vice-Admiral Sir Henry Oliver
 1920–1922 Vice-Admiral Sir Richard Phillimore
 1922–1923 Vice-Admiral Sir Douglas Nicholson
 1923–1924 Vice-Admiral Sir William Goodenough
 1924–1926 Vice-Admiral Sir Victor Stanley
 March–October 1926 Vice-Admiral Sir Rudolph Bentinck
 1926–1928 Vice-Admiral Sir Hugh Watson
 1928–1929 Vice-Admiral Sir William Boyle
 1929–1930 Vice-Admiral Percival Hall-Thompson
 1930–1932 Vice-Admiral Sir Frank Larken
 1932–1934 Vice-Admiral Sir William Kerr
 1934–1935 Vice-Admiral Edward Astley-Rushton
 1935–1937 Vice-Admiral Sir Gerald Dickens
 1937–1939 Vice Admiral Sir Max Horton
command then disbanded until 1944

Flag Officers commanding
Included:
 1944–1945 Rear-Admiral Charles Harris
 1945–1947 Rear-Admiral Leslie Ashmore 
 1947–1948 Rear-Admiral Reginald Servaes
 1948–1951 Vice-Admiral Sir Robin Bridge
 1951–1953 Vice-Admiral Sir Henry McCall
 1953–1954 Vice-Admiral Sir Ian Campbell
 1954–1955 Vice-Admiral Sir John Eaton
 1955–1956 Vice-Admiral Sir Peter Cazalet
 1956–1958 Vice-Admiral Sir Richard Onslow
 1958–1959 Vice-Admiral Sir Guy Sayer
 1959–1960 Rear-Admiral John Grant

Reserve divisions
Subordinate officers included:

Portsmouth Division

Rear Admiral Commanding Portsmouth Reserve 
 Rear-Admiral Edward F. Bruen, 1 February 1919 – 23 April 1919
 Rear-Admiral Cole C. Fowler, 23 April 1919 – 23 April 1920
 Rear-Admiral Clement Greatorex, 23 April 1920 – 1 October 1921
 Rear-Admiral Edmond H. Parker, 1 October 1921

Devonport Division

Rear Admiral Commanding Devonport Reserve 
 Rear-Admiral Douglas R. L. Nicholson, 1 February 1919 – 18 March 1919
 Rear-Admiral James A. Fergusson, 18 March 1919 – 9 April 1919
 Rear-Admiral Maurice Woollcombe, 9 April 1919 – 9 April 1920
 Rear-Admiral Philip H. Colomb, 9 April 1920
 Rear-Admiral Charles D. Johnson, 9 April 1921

Captain Commanding
 Captain Alfred A. Ellison, 16 May 1922 – 1 November 1922
 Captain Rowland H. Bather, 15 April 1922 – 1 July 1922 (temporary)
 Captain John E. Cameron, 1 November 1922 – April, 1924
 Captain Herbert A. Buchanan-Wollaston, 25 July 1927 – 17 April 1928
 Captain Edward B. Cloete, 3 November 1929 – 4 May 1931

Nore Division

Rear Admiral Commanding Nore Reserve 
 Rear-Admiral A. Thomas Hunt, 1 February 1919 – 8 March 1919
 Rear-Admiral Henry L. Mawbey, 17 March 1919 – 17 March 1920
 Rear-Admiral Vivian H. G. Bernard, 17 March 1920 – 17 March 1921
 Rear-Admiral William J. S. Alderson, 17 March 1921 – 15 April 1922

Captain Commanding Nore Reserve 
 Captain Lawrence W. Braithwaite, 24 April 1925 – 17 August 1926
 Captain Arthur L. Snagge, c. 1927
 Captain Claude C. Dobson, 17 October 1931 – 17 October 1933
 Captain Richard M. King, 17 October 1933 – 16 January 1935 (and as Captain of Cardiff)
 Captain Hamilton C. Allen, 16 January 1935 – 24 July 1935
 Captain John H. Young, 1 October 1935 – 1 September 1936

Rosyth Division

Vice-Admiral/Rear Admiral Commanding Rosyth Reserve 
 Vice-Admiral Sir Trevylyan D. W. Napier, 1 February 1919 – 1 May 1919
 Rear-Admiral Charles F. Corbett, 1 May 1919 – 1 May 1920
 Rear-Admiral Crawford Maclachlan, 1 May 1920
 Captain Henry P. Boxer, 28 January 1937 – 1 June 1938

Portland Division

Rear Admiral Commanding Portland Reserve 
 Rear-Admiral Sir Douglas R. L. Nicholson, 1 November 1919 – 1 April 1920

Vice-Admiral Reserve Fleet destroyers

Vice-Admiral Commanding
 Vice-Admiral Sir R. H. T. Raikes (1939-1945) (retired)

References

Sources

Fleets of the Royal Navy
Military units and formations of the Royal Navy in World War I
Military units and formations of the Royal Navy in World War II
Military units and formations disestablished in 1960